The 2008 Hel van het Mergelland was the 35th edition of the Volta Limburg Classic cycle race and was held on 5 April 2008. The race started and finished in Eijsden. The race was won by Tony Martin.

General classification

References

2008
2008 in road cycling
2008 in Dutch sport